A congressional charter is a law passed by the United States Congress that states the mission, authority, and activities of a group. Congress issued federal charters from 1791 until 1992 under Title 36 of the United States Code. The first charter issued by Congress was for the First Bank of the United States.

The relationship between Congress and an organization so recognized is largely symbolic, and is intended to lend the organization the legitimacy of being officially sanctioned by the U.S. government. Congress does not oversee or supervise organizations it has so chartered, aside from receiving a yearly financial statement.

Background
Until the District of Columbia was granted the ability to issue corporate charters in the late 1800s, corporations operating in the District required a congressional charter. With few exceptions, most corporations since created by Congress are not federally chartered but are simply created as District of Columbia corporations.

Some charters create corporate entities, akin to being incorporated at the federal level. Examples of such charters are the Federal Reserve Bank, Federal Deposit Insurance Corporation, Civil Air Patrol, Fannie Mae, Freddie Mac, and the Tennessee Valley Authority. Other national-level groups with such charters are the American Chemical Society, American Legion, American Red Cross, the Boy Scouts of America The Girl Scouts of the USA,  Little League Baseball Inc, the National Academy of Public Administration, The National Academy of Sciences, the National Ski Patrol, the National FFA Organization, the National Safety Council, National Park Foundation, the Disabled American Veterans, Veterans of Foreign Wars, National Trust for Historic Preservation, the United States Olympic Committee, the National Conference on Citizenship, and NeighborWorks America.

American University, Gallaudet University, Georgetown University, George Washington University, Howard University, and the Institute of American Indian Arts (IAIA) are the only congressionally chartered universities in the United States.

More common is a charter that recognizes a group already incorporated at the state level. These mostly honorific charters tend "to provide an 'official' imprimatur to their activities, and to that extent it may provide them prestige and indirect financial benefit". Groups that fall into this group are usually veterans’ groups, fraternal groups, youth groups or patriotic groups like the USO. Congress has chartered about 100 fraternal or patriotic groups.

Process
Eligibility for a charter is based on a group’s activities, whether they are unique, and whether or not they are in the public interest. If this is the case, a bill to grant a charter is introduced in Congress and must be voted into law.

Discontinuation
There had been questions regarding the federal government's power to manage corporations which have received charters. Amid dissatisfaction with the system, the subcommittee of the House Judiciary Committee decided not to consider applications for further charters in 1992, though several were still granted thereafter. The granting of a charter does not include congressional oversight.

See also
 Articles of association
 Articles of organization
 Certificate of incorporation
 Collegium (ancient Rome)
 Government-sponsored enterprise
 McCulloch v. Maryland (1819)
 Necessary and Proper Clause
 Royal charter

References

External links
 
 
 

Legislative branch of the United States government
Title 36 of the United States Code